Acromyrmex rugosus is a species of leaf-cutter ant, a New World ant of the subfamily Myrmicinae of the genus Acromyrmex. This species is from one of the two genera of advanced attines (fungus-growing ants) within the tribe Attini.

Subspecies
Acromyrmex rugosus rochai (Forel, 1904)
Acromyrmex rugosus santschii (Forel, 1911)

See also
List of leafcutter ants

References

Acromyrmex
Insects described in 1858